Callidula is a genus of moths of the family Callidulidae.

Species

Callidula arctata (Butler, 1877)
Callidula aruana (Butler, 1877)
Callidula atata (Swinhoe, 1909)
Callidula aureola (Swinhoe, 1905)
Callidula biplagiata (Butler, 1887)
Callidula dichroa (Boisduval, 1832)
Callidula erycinoides (Felder, 1874)
Callidula evander (Stoll, [1780])
Callidula fasciata (Butler, 1877)
Callidula hypoleuca Butler, 1887
Callidula jucunda Felder, 1874
Callidula kobesi Holloway, 1998
Callidula lata (Pagenstecher, 1887)
Callidula lunigera Butler, 1879
Callidula miokensis (Pagenstecher, 1884)
Callidula nenia Druce, 1888
Callidula nigresce (Butler, 1887)
Callidula oceanitis (Joicey & Talbot, 1916)
Callidula petavius (Stoll, 1781)
Callidula plagalis (Felder, 1874)
Callidula plioxantha (Kirsch, 1877)
Callidula posticalis (Guérin-Méneville, [1831])
Callidula propinqua (Butler, 1877)
Callidula sakuni (Horsfield, [1828])
Callidula sumatrensis Pagenstecher, 1887
Callidula versicolor (Felder, 1874)
Callidula waterstradti Holloway, 1998

External links
Callidula at funet
Callidula at the Moths of Borneo

Callidulidae
Moth genera